Lukket avdeling is a 1972 Norwegian drama film directed by Arnljot Berg. It was entered into the 22nd Berlin International Film Festival.

Cast
 Roy Bjørnstad - Vestfold
 Carsten Byhring - Vålerenga
 Vegard Hall - Gamlingen
 Erik Hivju - Harry
 Arne Lindtner Næss - Den tause
 Per Tofte - Playboy
 Carsten Winger - Hamlet
 Gard Øyen - Guttungen
 Eva von Hanno - Pleiersken
 Ole-Jørgen Nilsen - Paul Paulus
 Per Theodor Haugen - Overlegen
 Eilif Armand - Den tilknappede
 Willie Hoel - En pasientvenn
 Aud Schønemann - Kona til Vålerenga
 Freddy Lindquist - Musikeren

References

External links

1972 films
1970s Norwegian-language films
1972 drama films
Films directed by Arnljot Berg
Norwegian black-and-white films
Norwegian drama films